Field hockey competitions at the 2015 Pan American Games in Toronto were held from 13 to 25 July 2015, at the Pan Am / Parapan Am Fields, which are located on the back campus of the University of Toronto. A total of eight men's and women's teams will compete in each respective tournament.

The winners of the two tournaments qualified for the 2016 Summer Olympics in Rio de Janeiro, granted they were not already qualified as a host or via the 2014–15 Hockey World League Semifinals.

Competition schedule

The following is the competition schedule for the field hockey competitions:

Participating nations
A total of ten countries qualified field hockey teams.

Qualification
A total of eight men's teams and eight women's teams will qualify to compete at the games. The top two teams at the South American and Central American and Caribbean Games will qualify for each respective tournament. The host nation (Canada) automatically qualifies teams in both events. The remaining three spots in each tournament will be given to the three best teams from the respective 2013 Pan American Cup that have yet to qualify. This will happen after the two qualification tournaments in 2014 are played. Each nation may enter one team in each tournament (16 athletes per team) for a maximum total of 32 athletes.

Men

Women

Medal summary

Medal table

Medalists

Men's tournament

Preliminary round

Pool A

Pool B

Medal round

Women's tournament

Preliminary round

Pool A

Pool B

Medal round

References

Field hockey at the 2015 Pan American Games
Events at the 2015 Pan American Games
2015
Pan American Games
2015 Pan American Games